Eswatini College of Technology, also referred to a ECOT, is a state-owned college in Eswatini. It offers courses in engineering, science and education. Dr. Grace Mdluli is the current principal of the college. In 2011, the college collaborated with Vaal University of Technology in South Africa.

References

Universities and colleges in Eswatini
Educational institutions established in 1946
Mbabane
1946 establishments in the British Empire